Marie-Adélaïde (Marie-Adélaïde Thérèse Hilda Wilhelmine; 14 June 1894 – 24 January 1924), reigned as Grand Duchess of Luxembourg from 1912 until her abdication in 1919. She was the first Grand Duchess regnant of Luxembourg (after five grand dukes), its first female monarch since Duchess Maria Theresa (1740–1780, who was also Austrian Archduchess and Holy Roman Empress) and the first Luxembourgish monarch to be born within the territory since Count John the Blind (1296–1346).

Named as heir presumptive by her father Grand Duke William IV in 1907 to prevent a succession crisis due to his lack of a son, Marie-Adélaïde became Grand Duchess in 1912. She ruled through the First World War, and her perceived support for the German occupation forces led to great unpopularity in Luxembourg as well as neighbouring France and Belgium. In 1919, on the advice of Parliament and after enormous pressure from the Luxembourgish people, she abdicated on 14 January 1919 in favour of her younger sister Charlotte who managed to save the monarchy and the dynasty in a national referendum (28 September 1919).

After abdicating, Marie-Adélaïde retired in a monastery in Italy, before leaving due to ill health. She died of influenza in Germany on 24 January 1924, at the age of 29.

Early years

Marie-Adélaïde was born on 14 June 1894 in Berg Castle as the eldest child of Grand Duke William IV and his wife, Marie Anne of Portugal.

Since her father had six daughters and no sons, he proclaimed Marie-Adélaïde as the heir presumptive on 10 July 1907, in order to solve any succession crisis due to the use of Salic law in the monarchy.

Due to that same Salic Law, the elder branch of the House of Nassau, called Nassau-Weilburg (present-day Luxembourg-Nassau) inherited in 1890 the throne of Luxembourg from the younger branch called Nassau-Orange, which was not only supplying the Grand Dukes of Luxembourg from 1815 to 1890, but was also in a personal union the reigning dynasty of the Kingdom of the Netherlands.

Thus, when her father died on 25 February 1912, she succeeded to the throne at the age of 17, becoming the first reigning Grand Duchess of Luxembourg. Her mother served as regent until Marie-Adélaïde's eighteenth birthday on 18 June 1912, when the President of the Chamber Auguste Laval swore her in as the first Luxembourgish monarch to be born in the territory since Count John the Blind (1296–1346). Laval's speech to the Chamber of Deputies (parliament) during the ceremony was:

Marie-Adélaïde's own speech at the ceremony was:

Reign

Marie-Adélaïde was deeply interested in politics and took an active part in the government and the political life of the Grand Duchy in accordance with the Luxembourgish Constitution which at that time granted the monarch extensive political powers. She was a devout Roman Catholic, with strong religious convictions and very conservative  political views. On the day of her ascension to the throne – 25 February 1912 – she refused to sign a new law reducing the role of Roman Catholic priests within the education system. Later, in 1915, she hesitated before appointing the mayors of Differdange and Hollerich, both known for their anticlerical views.

With the outbreak of World War I Luxembourg found itself in a dangerous position, unable to defend itself from German invasion because of its neutral status (see Treaty of London (1867). When, on August 2, 1914 Germany violated the neutrality of Luxembourg on the pretext of protecting the railroads, Marie Adelaide and her government issued formal protests which failed to prevent the military occupation of the country.

Under the guidance of their ruler and her government, Luxembourg and its people, now behind German lines, wisely did not attempt a foolhardy and vain resistance to the occupying army, but maintained their neutrality throughout the war. (This was to be held against them by the victorious Allies.) Marie Adelaide devoted herself to the work of the Red Cross in Luxembourg and nursed soldiers on both fronts. Political tensions, however, continued unabated throughout the war. The increasingly hostile leftists within Luxembourg seized on every excuse to discredit their royal opponent. Marie Adelaide was of German blood; she had agreed to her sister’s betrothal to a German prince; she went to the funeral of an elderly relative in Germany; she had received the Kaiser in her palace (she had, in fact, only learned of his proposed visit when he was already on his way), and apparently agreed, on the advice of her prime minister and against her better judgment, to receive the German commander when he entered the country.

Meanwhile, in late 1915 the Grand Duchess caused controversy by dissolving the Chamber of Deputies to solve the deadlock faced by the Loutsch Ministry, which was composed of Party of the Right members and did not have a majority in the Chamber. Marie-Adélaïde ordered the Chamber dissolved and new elections held on 23 December 1915. This action was permissible under the Constitution, but regarded as unconventional, and provoked an outcry and long-term resentment among the socialists and liberals in parliament, who saw it as resembling a coup d'état.

After the end of the war Marie-Adélaïde was harshly criticised for her attitude and the perception of the Grand Duchess as pro-German led the French government to declare: "The French Government does not consider it possible to have contact or negotiations with the Government of the Grand Duchess of Luxembourg, whom it considers as gravely compromised …"

Although she had not done anything flagrantly in contradiction with the Luxembourgish Constitution (of 1868, with a major revision in 1919 after her departure), voices in Parliament began to demand her abdication in January 1919.

On 9 January, a group of Socialist and Liberal Luxembourgish Members of Parliament ("Deputies") publicly proclaimed a republic after losing a vote in parliament to abolish the monarchy, a situation which was followed by public unrest in the streets requiring even the intervention of the French Army to restore order. Under intense national (and international) pressure, and after consulting with the Prime Minister, the 24-year-old Grand Duchess decided to abdicate (14 January 1919). She was succeeded by her younger sister, Princess Charlotte.

Governments
Marie-Adélaïde's reign saw the following Prime Ministers and Governments:
 Paul Eyschen (Eyschen Ministry)
 Mathias Mongenast (Mongenast Ministry)
 Hubert Loutsch (Loutsch Ministry)
 Victor Thorn (Thorn Ministry)
 Léon Kauffman (Kauffman Ministry)
 Émile Reuter (Reuter Ministry)

Post-abdication

After her abdication Marie-Adélaïde went into exile by travelling through Europe. She entered a Carmelite convent in Modena, Italy, in 1920. Later, she joined the Little Sisters of the Poor in Rome, taking the name "Sister Marie of the Poor". Her worsening health did not allow her to remain a nun, however, and she eventually had to leave the convent. She then moved to Schloss Hohenburg in Bavaria, where, surrounded by her family, she died of influenza aged 29 on 24 January 1924. Marie-Adélaïde never married nor had children. On 22 October 1947, her body was interred in the Grand Ducal Crypt of the Notre-Dame Cathedral in the city of Luxembourg.

Titles and honours

Titles
 14 June 1894 – 10 July 1907: Her Grand Ducal Highness Princess Marie-Adélaïde of Luxembourg
 10 July 1907 – 25 February 1912: Her Royal Highness The Hereditary Grand Duchess of Luxembourg
 25 February 1912 – 14 January 1919: Her Royal Highness The Grand Duchess of Luxembourg
 14 January 1919 – 24 January 1924: Her Royal Highness Grand Duchess Marie-Adelaide of Luxembourg later Sister Marie of the Poor

National honours
 : Grand Master of the Order of the Gold Lion of the House of Nassau
 : Grand Master of the Order of Adolphe of Nassau
 : Grand Master of the Order of the Oak Crown

Ancestry

See also
 German occupation of Luxembourg in World War I

References

Further reading

 O'Shaughnessy, Edith. Marie Adelaide, Grand Duchess of Luxemburg, Duchess of Nassau. New York: Jonathan Cape and Robert Ballou, 1932.
 Schous, Marie. Marie Adelheid van Nassau, Groothertogin van Luxemburg. 's Hertogenbosch: G. Mosmans, 1931.
 Zenner, Theodor. Marie Adelheid: Lebensbild der verstorbenen Grossherzogin von Luxemburg. 1925
 Marburg, Theodor. The Story of a Soul. Philadelphia: Dorrance, 1938.
 Leighton, Isabel, and Bertram Bloch. Marie-Adelaide: A Play. New York: Rialto Service Bureau.
 Marie-Adélaïde (in French) at the official website of the Luxembourg royal family

House of Nassau-Weilburg
Grand Dukes of Luxembourg
Luxembourgian women in World War I
Luxembourgian Roman Catholics
1894 births
1924 deaths
People from Colmar-Berg
Burials at Notre-Dame Cathedral, Luxembourg
Monarchs who abdicated

Luxembourgian Roman Catholic religious sisters and nuns
20th-century women rulers
Royal reburials